Marcel Oster (born April 5, 1989 in Suhl, Germany) is a German luger who has been competing since 2008. He finished 19th in the men's doubles standings in the 2008–09 Luge World Cup together with Toni Eggert.

He has been running luge since 2000.

He has started with Toni Eggert in the men's doubles from 2003 - 2010. 2007 and 2008 he won the world youth championship. 2008 he won the world youth world cup.

See also
List of Luge World Cup champions
European Luge Championships
European Luge Natural Track Championships
Skeleton

References

External links
FIL-Luge profile

German male lugers
Living people
1989 births
People from Suhl
Sportspeople from Thuringia
21st-century German people